Xie Caizhen  was a Chinese actress, writer and film director recognised to be the first woman in China to direct a film. Other than her appearance in three films and her one directorial role, little is known about her life prior to or following her film career. The film she directed and which she also wrote and appeared in was named An Orphan's Cry (孤雏悲声) (1925).

Xie was active during the 1920s and 1930s silent era of film and originally worked at the Shanghai Shadow Play Company which was established in 1920 by early Chinese film director Dan Duyu. Here she was cast in two films by Duyu, Return to the Hometown (重返故乡) (1925) and Little Master (小公子) (1925).

Later she is said to have worked for a short-lived production company run by director Li Jiran called Nanxing Film Company where she gained her directorial debut. The film which was the company's only feature produced during its lifetime was called An Orphan's Cry (孤雏悲声) (1925) and was a melodrama involving a dysfunctional family. Upon the film's release it is said to have caused a sensation among audiences owing to the director being female and the film's complex storyline.

References

Bibliography

External links
 
 Xie Caizhen at wfpp.columbia.edu

Chinese women film directors
Chinese silent film actresses
Date of birth unknown
Date of death unknown
Year of birth unknown
Year of death unknown
Chinese women screenwriters
Chinese silent film directors
Women film pioneers